Rashid "Rash" Khabugovich Khutaba (born 10 February 1951) is a retired freestyle wrestler from Abkhazia. Competing in the 100 kg division he won the Soviet national title in 1981 and the European title in 1982. After retiring from competitions he coached his sons Bagrat and Badzhgur, who also became international heavyweight freestyle wrestlers, and headed the Greco-Roman and freestyle wrestling federations of Abkhazia. An international wrestling tournament is held annually in Gudauta in his honor.

References

1951 births
Living people
Soviet male sport wrestlers